Mark Edward Phelps (born January 22, 1966) is an American basketball coach who is currently the head coach at Prolific Prep. Prior to his current job, Phelps was an assistant at the University of Arizona from 2015-2019. Phelps spent the 2013–14 season as an assistant coach for Marquette University. His most recent NCAA head coaching job was with the Drake University men's basketball team. He was named the 25th head basketball coach at Drake University and successor to Keno Davis on April 21, 2008.  He was fired by Drake on March 14, 2013. He has a B.S. in physical education from Old Dominion University, which he received in 1996, and is a 1984 graduate of Kempsville High School in Virginia Beach, Virginia.

On May 18, 2015, Phelps was hired as an assistant to Sean Miller's staff at the University of Arizona. Phelps was hired to replace assistant Damon Stoudamire who left to return to his old position under Josh Pastner at the University of Memphis.

Head coaching record

References

External links 
Mark Phelps Drake Profile
Mark Phelps Rivals.com Profile

1966 births
Living people
American men's basketball coaches
Arizona State Sun Devils men's basketball coaches
Basketball coaches from Ohio
College men's basketball head coaches in the United States
Drake Bulldogs men's basketball coaches
Marquette Golden Eagles men's basketball coaches
Missouri Tigers men's basketball coaches
NC State Wolfpack men's basketball coaches
Old Dominion University alumni
Sportspeople from Dayton, Ohio